The Consejo Coordinador Argentino Sindical (CCAS) is a National trade union center of Argentina. It is led by Victor R. Huerta.

The CCAS is affiliated to the International Trade Union Confederation.

References

National trade union centers of Argentina
World Federation of Trade Unions